Peki College of Education is a teacher education college in Peki (South Dayi District, Volta Region, Ghana). The college is located in Volta Zone. It is one of the about 40 public colleges of education in Ghana. The college participated in the DFID-funded T-TEL programme.

As of May 2019, the college is affiliated to the University of Ghana.

History 
Peki College of Education, formerly Government Training College, GOVCO, Peki was established on the 12TH of February, 1954 with 30 men. It remained a male institution until 1961 when 25 women were admitted. The first principal of the college was Mr. A.F. Neale. The motto of the college is ‘ NIHIL SINNE LABORE’.

The college started with a 2-year Certificate ‘A’ Post ‘B’ programme, and has gone through the following programmes since then: 2-year Certificate ‘A’ Post Secondary; 2-year Art Education and Geography Specialist programme; 3-year Certificate ‘A’ Post Secondary course, 4-year Certificate ‘A’ Post Middle; 2-year Modular programme for untrained teachers for a 2-year Post Modular Certificate ‘A’ course, and the following Diploma in Basic Education programmes, 3-year Post Secondary (Regular); 4-year Untrained Teachers; 2-year Post ‘A’ sandwich that were introduced in 2004, 2005, and 2006 respectively as well as a 4-year Certificate ‘A’ programme for untrained teachers.

Around 1995, the College fell on academic evil days, and performed poorly in external examinations. Determined to change the status quo, the principal and staff put their shoulders to the wheel and worked tirelessly till the College scored 100% in 1998. Since then, the college has maintained an enviable academic standard, and has placed herself firmly on an enviable pedestal among her peers.

References 

Colleges of Education in Ghana
Education in Volta Region